The 2017 Durham mayoral election was held on November 7, 2017 to elect the mayor of Durham, North Carolina. It saw the election of Steve Schewel.

Results

Primary 
The date of the primary was October 10, 2017.

General election

References 

Durham
Mayoral elections in Durham, North Carolina
Durham